Zsupánek is a surname. Notable people with the surname include:

János Zsupánek (1861–1951), Slovenian writer and poet
Mihály Zsupánek (1830–1898/1905), Slovenian poet, father of János